Vue d'optique (French), vue perspective or perspective view refers to a genre of etching popular during the second half of the 18th century and into the 19th. Vues d'optique were specifically developed to provide the illusion of depth when viewed through a zograscope, also known as an "optical diagonal machine" or viewers with similar functions.

Characteristics
Reversed type in some or all of the text, for viewing through a mirrored apparatus
Bright hand-coloring
Scenes chosen for their strong linear perspective (for example, diagonal lines converging at a horizon)
Subject matter appealing to armchair travelers: shipping, cities, palaces, gardens, architecture.

History
Optical viewers were generally popular with well-to-do European families in the late 18th and early 19th centuries. Perspective views were produced in London, Paris, Augsburg and several other cities.

Gallery

References

Etching